is a Japanese manga artist and illustrator. He is known as the creator of Yozakura Quartet and for illustrating the light novel series Durarara!! and Is It Wrong to Try to Pick Up Girls in a Dungeon?, all of which have been adapted into anime series. He is also the character designer for the Shin Megami Tensei: Devil Survivor video game series and Digimon Story: Cyber Sleuth.

Biography 
Suzuhito began drawing when he was 19 years old, after being inspired by Range Murata's pictures. As an illustrator he usually works with novels; providing the cover art and illustrations. He also makes logo designs for companies and games. Atlus hired him to design the characters from  Shin Megami Tensei: Devil Survivor and  Shin Megami Tensei: Devil Survivor 2 to appeal to a new audience.

Works

Character design

Games 
Shin Megami Tensei: Devil Survivor
Unchained Blades
Shin Megami Tensei: Devil Survivor 2
Digimon World Re:Digitize
Digimon Story: Cyber Sleuth
Digimon Story: Cyber Sleuth - Hacker's Memory
Unchained Blades Exxiv
Caladrius
Fire Emblem Heroes (original character designs)

Anime 
Gundam Build Fighters (2013, cooperation)
Ai Tenchi Muyo! (2014)
Dive!! (2017, original character design)
Salaryman's Club (2022, original character design)

Other 
Hololive Indonesia - Kaela Kovalskia

Artworks 
"Ebony & Ivory" chapters in Robot: Super Color Comic volume 1 and 2
"Minus R" chapter in Robot: Super Color Comic volume 4

Light novel illustrations
 Kamisama Kazoku (2003–2008, Media Factory)
 Durarara!! (2004–2014, ASCII Media Works)
 Is It Wrong to Try to Pick Up Girls in a Dungeon? (2013–ongoing, SB Creative)
  Durarara!! SH (2014–ongoing, ASCII Media Works)

Manga
Pinky:Comic (2005, serialized in Comic Gum, Wani Books)
 Yozakura Quartet (2006–ongoing, serialized in the Monthly Shōnen Sirius, Kodansha) (2008 licensed by Del Rey Manga)
Bootsleg (2019, serialized in Monthly Shōnen Sirius)

References

External links
  

 Suzuhito Yasuda manga at Media Arts Database 
Twitter

Anime character designers
Living people
Manga artists from Mie Prefecture
Year of birth missing (living people)